Sydney Pickrem (born May 21, 1997) is a Canadian competitive swimmer. Pickrem won a bronze medal in the 400 m individual medley at the 2017 World Aquatics Championships. At the 2015 Pan American Games, she won a silver in the 400 m and bronze in the 200 m individual medleys. Pickrem won her first international medal competing at the 2013 FINA World Junior Swimming Championships in Dubai, winning the bronze in the 200 m individual medley.

Career
Sydney Pickrem made her first senior national team in 2014, winning bronze medals in the 200 m and 400 m individual medley at Canadian Swimming Trials to earn spots at the 2014 Commonwealth Games and 2014 Pan Pacific Swimming Championships.

Pickrem, who specializes in the breaststroke and individual medley, was selected to the 2012 Junior Pan Pacific Swimming Championships. In 2013, she represented Canada at the Australian Youth Olympic Festival in January where she won four medals: gold in the 200 m backstroke and 200 m IM, and silver in the 400 m IM and 200 m breaststroke. At the 4th FINA World Junior Swimming Championships in Dubai, Pickrem won a bronze in the 200 m IM.

2016 Summer Olympics 
In 2016, she was officially named to Canada's Olympic team for the 2016 Summer Olympics where she performed admirably, finishing sixth in the 200 m individual medley as a 19 year old. In the 400 m individual medley, she finished 12th in qualifying and failed to advance to the final.

2017 World Championships 
Pickrem competed at the 2017 World Championships where she participated in both the 200 and 400 individual medleys. She qualified for the final with the third fastest time in the 200 m, putting her in the running for a medal. In the final Pickrem met with disappointment when she suddenly pulled out of the pool after the 50 m butterfly after apparently swallowing too much water. She bounced back and captured a bronze medal in the 400 m individual medley, setting a personal best in the process. After the race an emotional Pickrem said "As much as I felt like I disappointed Canada in my 200 IM, to come back and be able to get on the podium, it's just a relief and really exciting. I'm proud to be Canadian and do that for Canada."

2019 World Championships 
The 2019 World Championships were one of Pickrem's most decorated events. She won her second bronze medal in the 200 m individual medley. Pickrem won a second bronze medal while swimming the breaststroke leg of the women's medley relay together with Penny Oleksiak, Maggie Mac Neil, and Kylie Masse. She set a Canadian record in the 200 m breaststroke on her way to winning her third bronze medal of the competition. Her three individual bronze medals meant that she was the most decorated Canadian female swimmer at the FINA World Championships, as some of Oleksiak's medals were won in relays.

2020 Summer Olympics 
Named to Canada's 2020 Olympic team, Pickrem won a bronze medal as part of Canada's 4×100 m medley relay team, again alongside Masse, Mac Neil and Oleksiak. In an interview post-race, Pickrem gained a viral social media moment when she accidentally cursed on live television while stating how nervous she was for her leg of the race. A non-Covid related illness forced Pickrem out of starting her favoured individual events the 400 m individual medley and 100 m breaststroke, where she had just won medals at in the FINA World Championships. She would swim the 200 m medley and place in sixth position.

2021 World Short Course Championships
Pickrem brought home more hardware at the 2021 FINA World Swimming Championships (25 m). In the 200 m individual medley she trailed Kate Douglass and Yu Yiting after the first 100 m but used her stronger breaststroke to take the lead by the 150 m mark to take the gold medal. After the win, Pickrem said that "I knew I had to have my best back half, that's my strength. The times don't really matter with how my prep has been this season, it's just getting up and racing." She would add another gold after swimming the semi-final for Canadian women's 4x200 metre freestyle relay team, which won gold in the final. Pickrem also swam the breaststroke leg of the 4x100 metre medley relay, finishing in second place for her third medal of the competition.

Personal life
Pickrem has dual nationality having been born in the United States, her parents are both Canadians from Halifax, Nova Scotia. She comes from a sporting background as her father Darren Pickrem, played in the Quebec Major Junior Hockey League. With roots in Nova Scotia, Pickrem also lists Clearwater, Florida as her hometown and Prince Edward Island as her favourite place to visit.

Personal bests

Long course (50-meter pool)

Short course (25-meter pool)

References

External links
 
 
 
 
 
 
 

1997 births
Living people
Canadian female medley swimmers
Swimmers at the 2014 Commonwealth Games
Swimmers at the 2015 Pan American Games
Swimmers at the 2016 Summer Olympics
Naturalized citizens of Canada
Olympic swimmers of Canada
Pan American Games silver medalists for Canada
People from Oldsmar, Florida
Pan American Games medalists in swimming
World Aquatics Championships medalists in swimming
Medalists at the FINA World Swimming Championships (25 m)
Canadian female breaststroke swimmers
Medalists at the 2015 Pan American Games
Commonwealth Games competitors for Canada
Swimmers at the 2020 Summer Olympics
Medalists at the 2020 Summer Olympics
Olympic bronze medalists in swimming
Olympic bronze medalists for Canada
Texas A&M Aggies women's swimmers
21st-century Canadian women